Sani Mohammed is a Nigerian politician and a former member of the Senate of Nigeria for the All Progressives Congress.

Mohammed was born in Bida, Niger State. He was senator for Niger South Senatorial District (2015–2019).

He came third in the senatorial race in the 2019 general election. He had been cleared by the National Working Committee of his party, alongside the other Zones senators, on 4 October 2018 to contest the primary. Later, his name was substituted at the last minute for Bima Mohammed Enagi.

Awards and honours 
 Doctor of Science (Honoris Causa): Gregory University, Uturu, Nigeria

References

Members of the Senate (Nigeria)
All Progressives Congress politicians
People from Niger State
People from Bida